The year 1903 was marked, in science fiction, by the following events.

Births and deaths

Births 
 January 3 :  René Brantonne, French illustrator and cartoonist (died 1979)
 May 21 : Manly Wade Wellman, American writer (died 1986)
 June 25 : George Orwell, British writer and journalist (died 1950)
 July 10 : John Wyndham, British writer (died 1969)

Deaths

Events

Awards 
The main science-fiction Awards known at the present time did not exist at this time.

Literary releases

Novels 

 Force ennemie, French novel by John Antoine Nau.

Stories collections

Short stories 
Publication of The Land Ironclads by H.G. Wells. A pre-vision of military tanks, including their use in overrunning positions defended by infantry. The land ironclads used feet rather than caterpillar tracks to traverse irregular terrain. The story is narrated by a war correspondent.

Comics

Audiovisual outputs

Movies

See also 
 1903 in science
 1902 in science fiction
 1904 in science fiction

References

science-fiction
Science fiction by year